Baba Looey is a fictional Mexican donkey that appeared in The Quick Draw McGraw Show. He is the deputy and familiar to Sheriff Quick Draw McGraw. He speaks English with a Mexican accent. He was originally voiced by Daws Butler.

Character
Baba Looey, McGraw's sidekick, is often portrayed as the more thoughtful half of the duo. At times realizing some detail about a given situation, Baba Looey tries desperately to caution Quick Draw of a trap or other danger, before Quick Draw charges headlong into the fray without listening or giving consideration to his surroundings. His identity of masked vigilante is El Kapoli, "champion of champions" as he declared. In the episode "Dizzy Desperado", he gets knocked in the head and switches to the criminal Little Cucaracha.

Popular culture
 Gary Dell'Abate, the executive producer of The Howard Stern Show, received his nickname from his mispronunciation of Baba Looey's name. On July 26, 1990, Gary mistakenly called Baba Looey "Baba Booey" during a discussion of original cartoon cels, saying that he was thinking about getting "Quick Draw McGraw and Baba Booey" cels next. Gary Dell'Abate is now more infamously known by 'Baba Booey' than his own name.
 In the Daria episode "Lane Miserables", Trent asks the title character, "Why did Quick Draw McGraw hang around with that freaky little mule?"
 The name is a satirical portmanteau of "Babalú" which is a traditional Cuban song that Desi Arnaz made popular in the United States and uy which is a Spanish interjection.

Other appearances
 In an episode of The Brady Bunch, Marcia can be seen watching Baba Looey and Quick Draw McGraw on TV.
 Baba Looey, along with Quick Draw McGraw, makes an appearance in the Samurai Jack episode "The Good, The Bad, and the Beautiful", voiced by Greg Burson.
 He appears in the Harvey Birdman, Attorney at Law episode "Guitar Control", voiced by Rob Paulsen. He is seen hanging out with Peanut and shows him Quick Draw's guitars. Peanut wonders how it works and kills Baba Looey with it.
 Baba Looey made a brief cameo in a MetLife commercial in 2012.
 In the Drawn Together episode "Breakfast Food Killer", Baba Looey made an appearance going by the name "Baba Booey". He was waiting in line to become the new mascot of Quackers cereal and randomly started jumping around and attacking people.
 Baba Looey appears in the series Jellystone! and is female and Cuban in this version called "Bobbie Louie" due to the character being voiced by Jenny Lorenzo. She works for the Jellystone government and has an American accent.
 Baba Looey and Quick Draw McGraw make a cameo as silhouettes in the 2020 Animaniacs revival segment "Suffragette City".

References

Fictional police officers
Fictional donkeys
Fictional murdered people
Fictional Mexican people
Fictional anthropomorphic characters
Television sidekicks
Hanna-Barbera characters
Western (genre) peace officers
Yogi Bear characters
Television characters introduced in 1959
Animated characters introduced in 1959
Male characters in animation